Selenium-79 is a radioisotope of selenium present in spent nuclear fuel and the wastes resulting from reprocessing this fuel. It is one of only 7 long-lived fission products. Its fission yield is low (about 0.04%), as it is near the lower end of the mass range for fission products. Its half-life has been variously reported as 650,000 years, 65,000 years, 1.13 million years, 480,000 years, 295,000 years, 377,000 years and most recently with best current precision, 327,000 years.

79Se decays to 79Br by emitting a beta particle with no attendant gamma radiation (i.e., 100% β decay). This complicates its detection and liquid scintillation counting (LSC) is required for measuring it in environmental samples. The low specific activity (5.1 × 108 Bq/g) and relatively low energy (151 keV) of its beta particles have been said to limit the radioactive hazards of this isotope.

Performance assessment calculations for the Belgian deep geological repository estimated 79Se may be the major contributor to activity release in terms of becquerels (decays per second), "attributable partly to the uncertainties about its migration behaviour in the Boom Clay and partly to its conversion factor in the biosphere." (p. 169). However, "calculations for the Belgian safety assessments use a half-life of 65 000 years" (p. 177), much less than the currently estimated half-life, and "the migration parameters ... have been estimated very cautiously for 79Se." (p. 179)

Neutron absorption cross sections for 79Se have been estimated at 50 barns for thermal neutrons and 60.9 barns for resonance integral.

Selenium-80 and selenium-82 have higher fission yields, about 20 times the yield of 79Se in the case of uranium-235, 6 times in the case of plutonium-239 or uranium-233, and 14 times in the case of plutonium-241.

Mobility of selenium in the environment
Due to redox-disequilibrium, selenium could be very reluctant to abiotic chemical reduction and would be released from the waste (spent fuel or vitrified waste) as selenate, a soluble Se(VI) species, not sorbed onto clay minerals. Without solubility limit and retardation for aqueous selenium, the dose of 79Se is comparable to that of 129I. Moreover, selenium is an essential micronutrient as it is present in the catalytic centers in the glutathione peroxidase, an enzyme needed by many organisms for the protection of their  cell membrane against oxidative stress damages; therefore, radioactive 79Se can be easily bioconcentrated in the food web. In the presence of nitrate released in deep geological clay formations by bituminized waste issued from the spent fuel dissolution step during their reprocessing, even reduced forms of selenium could be easily oxidised and mobilised.

References

See also
Isotopes of selenium
ANL factsheet
Journal of Analytical Atomic Spectrometry

Fission products
Isotopes of selenium
Radioactive waste